The New York Express was a soccer team based out of Uniondale, New York that played in the Major Indoor Soccer League. They played only part of the 1986–87 MISL season before folding during the league's midseason All-Star Break. Their home arena was Nassau Veterans Memorial Coliseum. They were owned by Stan Henry.

The Express were an expansion franchise for the 1986–87 season, owned in part by New York Cosmos goalie Shep Messing, who saw limited action for the team. The Express also featured former Cosmos star and U.S. National Team player Rick Davis and Iran National Team Star Andranik Eskandarian. A 0–10 start cost initial coach Ray Klivecka his job on December 23, 1986. The team managed only a 3–23 record and folded at the All-Star Break due to financial problems.

The Express were the fourth and final attempt by the MISL to establish itself in the New York market, after previously failing with the New York Arrows (1978–1984), who also played at Nassau Coliseum, the New Jersey Rockets (1981–1982), and the post-NASL New York Cosmos, (1984–1985).

Former coaches
 Ray Klivecka
 Don Popovic
 Mark Steffens

References

External links
 
  N.Y. Express Games were broadcast on WBAU radio. Play-by-play highlights.

 
Defunct indoor soccer clubs in the United States
Sports in Long Island
Express
Major Indoor Soccer League (1978–1992) teams